Bang Bang Jump Up is a solitary jump up in Stokes, Shire of Carpentaria, Queensland, Australia.

Geography 
Bang Bang Jump Up is 106 km southwest of Normanton on the Burke Developmental Road, where the terrain rises abruptly from 20 metres above sea level to 50 metres above sea level after many kilometres of flat terrain.

This jump up is noted because it is one of the few elevated areas located in the middle of an expansive flat grassland. The unusual name for the hill has landed it on a number of lists for interesting or unusual place names. The name is presumably derived from the nearby Bang Bang Homestead and/or Bang Bang Waterhole.

References

External links 
 Map of Bang Bang Jump Up

North West Queensland
Shire of Carpentaria
Mountains of Queensland